Evening Snow Will Bring Such Peace is a novel by David Adams Richards, published in 1990. It was the second volume in his Miramichi trilogy, which also included the novels Nights Below Station Street (1988) and For Those Who Hunt the Wounded Down (1993).

The novel centres primarily on Ivan and Cindi Bastarache, a couple whose troubled marriage begins to disintegrate when Cindi, who suffers from epilepsy, injures herself during a fight with Ivan over money, leading their family and friends to believe that Ivan has committed domestic violence against her.

The novel won the Canadian Authors Association award for fiction in 1991.

References

1990 Canadian novels
Novels by David Adams Richards
New Canadian Library